Salman Hossain (born 18 June 1995) is a Bangladeshi first-class cricketer who plays for Barisal Division. He also played bangladesh national under-19 world cup In 2012. and he made his list A debut in September 2013 for Cricket Coaching School against Abahoni limited. Recently he played Bangladesh Premier League (BPL) for Fortune Barishal 2022.

See also
 List of Barisal Division cricketers

References

External links
 

1995 births
Living people
Bangladeshi cricketers
Barisal Division cricketers
People from Barisal
Rajshahi Royals cricketers
Agrani Bank Cricket Club cricketers